Counter-Measures and The New Counter-Measures are Big Finish Productions audio play series based on the television series Doctor Who. Continuing the story of several characters from the serial Remembrance of the Daleks (1988), the British government establishes a new organization called Counter-Measures to investigate reports of advanced technology, the supernatural and alien sightings.

Cast
 Simon Williams as Ian Gilmore – The Counter-Measures' group captain and a Royal Air Force officer, he served as the first leader of the Intrusion Counter-Measures Group.
 Pamela Salem as Rachel Jensen – A professor and the scientific adviser for Gilmore, who becomes the head of Counter-Measures after him.
 Karen Gledhill as Allison Williams – Jensen's research assistant in 1963.
 Hugh Ross as Toby Kinsella – A British civil servant who oversaw the original Intrusion Countermeasures Group.

Production
Counter-Measures was initially announced in April 2012, and set for release the following July. The series was announced to reunite the cast of Remembrance of the Daleks (1988), including Simon Williams as Captain Gilmore, Pamela Salem as Rachel Jensen and Karen Gledhill as Allison, as well as the inclusion of Hugh Ross as Toby Kinsella. Alastair Mackenzie was also included as Allison's boyfriend Julian. The series was announced to be continuing by Doctor Who Magazine and writer Cavan Scott in December 2012.

The New Counter-Measures was developed after the initial Counter-Measures range concluded, and was planned to be a "transitional period" for the titular group, combining the story of Remembrance of the Daleks with the creation of the United Nations Intelligence Taskforce. The series was initially released as two specials in July 2016, followed by a full series the following December, with the full cast of the original series returning. The New Counter-Measures was initially announced as concluded in February 2019; however, two further specials were announced in August 2019, set for release in April and May 2020.

Reception
Games Radar reviewed the first series of Counter-Measures, commenting on the series' "political reality" and the original episode's "lack of rose-tinted nostalgia". The leads were praised on how they were able to reprise their roles from the television series, though the level of unevenness was commented on, on how some episodes featured over-used sound effects and plots of other episodes were "far-fetched"; however, the series overall was rated positively as a promising start. Starburst Magazine awarded the second series 8 out of 10, approving the move from the technology that was focused on in the first series to the character-led development of the second series, especially Sir Toby.

Steve Mollmann of Unreality SF reviewed the third season, and commented on how he was initially disappointed by the finale of the second series and its lead-in to the third series. Mollmann's best reviewed story was Unto the Breach, with compliments to the Cold War storyline and Hugh Ross's acting as Sir Toby. Overall, he reviewed the third series as "not Counter-Measures at its best", but that the ending of the series "promises Series 4 to be a return to form". Doctor Who News reviewed the fourth series of Counter-Measures with a positive review, commenting on the new approaches to the stories in comparison to previous seasons, specifically how the stories were interlinked, as well as the character development. The site's review praised the cast as having settled into their roles by the time of the fourth series, particularly noting Hugh Ross's role. David Herron from Tech Sparx favourably compared the series to Doctor Whos UNIT and Doctor Who itself, stating that contained a lot of what made Doctor Who famous "except for time travel and the alien from a hugely advanced civilization".

We Are Cults Michael Seely reviewed the first series of The New Counter-Measures, praising Big Finish's confidence with the series and compared the series to "ITC spy series", as well as noting the lack of a series arc during the series. He commented on each episode of the series with positive comments, commenting on how the narrative drove at a "cracking good pace" in the first episode, how the second episode wasn't as "jolly" as the first but still maintained an interesting setup and plot, while the third returned to London and was at first confusing but later became "[a] roller-coaster of an episode" and the best of the series, while the fourth episode closed off the series in a surprising fashion. Jordan Shortman of Blogtor Who favourably compared the second series to the original series in how it created a familiar feeling of taking place closer to home. Shortman commented on the light-hearted episodes and the element of paranoia as a plot point, while also praising how the third episode was "slower paced", but still "works in some nice foreshadowing". The majority of his praise went to director Ken Bentley's direction, who brought forth the tension and best points of the actors, giving the overall series a 9 out of 10.

Episodes

Counter-Measures

Series 1 (2012)

Series 2 (2013)

Series 3 (2014)

Series 4 (2015)

The New Counter-Measures

Specials (2016)

Series 1 (2016)

Series 2 (2017)

Series 3 (2019–20)

References

Audio plays based on Doctor Who
Big Finish Productions
Doctor Who spin-offs